Gaétan Proulx is a bishop of Roman Catholic Archdiocese of Quebec. Born 27 May 1947 in Saint-Denis-de-Brompton, Quebec, he became a Professed Member of the Order of Servants of Mary On 5 Sep 1969 and was ordained a priest on 8 Jun 1975.

On 12 December 2011 he was appointed, by pope Benedict XVI, Auxiliary Bishop of Québec, Canada and Titular Bishop of Azura in North Africa. His principle consecrators were Bishops Paul Lortie, Bishop of Mont-Laurier and Gilles Lemay, Bishop of Amos.

References

21st-century Roman Catholic bishops in Canada
1947 births
Living people
People from Estrie